Nicolai Andrews (born 3 November 2002) is a Guyanese professional footballer who plays as a defender for GFF Elite League club Santos and the Guyana national team.

References 

2002 births
Living people
Guyanese footballers
Association football defenders
Guyana international footballers
Santos FC (Guyana) players
GFF Elite League players